The Central Highlands, Central High Plateau, or Hauts-Plateaux are a mountainous biogeographical region in central Madagascar. They include the contiguous part of the island's interior above 800 m (2,600 ft) altitude. The Central Highlands are separated from the Northern Highlands of the northern tip of Madagascar by a low-lying valley, the Mandritsara Window, which has apparently acted as a barrier to dispersal for species in the highlands, leading to species pairs such as Voalavo gymnocaudus and Voalavo antsahabensis in the Northern and Central Highlands. Species restricted to the Central Highlands include the bats Miniopterus manavi and Miniopterus sororculus; the rodents Brachyuromys betsileoensis and Voalavo antsahabensis; the tenrecs Hemicentetes nigriceps and Oryzorictes tetradactylus; and the lemur Cheirogaleus sibreei. Because of the continuous habitat of the Central Highlands, there is little local endemism, unlike the Northern Highlands.

Notes

References
Bronner, G.N. & Jenkins, P.D. 2005. Order Afrosoricida. Pp. 71–81 in Wilson, D.E. and Reeder, D.M. (eds.). Mammal Species of the World: a taxonomic and geographic reference. 3rd ed. Baltimore: The Johns Hopkins University Press, 2 vols., 2142 pp. 
Garbutt, N. 2007. Mammals of Madagascar: A Complete Guide. London: A & C Black, 304 pp. 
Goodman, S.M., Rakotondravony, D., Randriamanantsoa, H.N. and Rakotomalala-Razanahoera, M. 2005. A new species of rodent from the montane forest of central eastern Madagascar (Muridae: Nesomyinae: Voalavo). Proceedings of the Biological Society of Washington 118(4):863–873.
Goodman, S.M., Raxworthy, C.J., Maminirina, C.P. and Olson, L.E. 2006. A new species of shrew tenrec (Microgale jobihely) from northern Madagascar. Journal of Zoology 270:384–398.
Goodman, S.M., Ryan, K.E., Maminirina, C.P., Fahr, J., Christidis, L. and Appleton, B. 2007. Specific status of populations on Madagascar referred to Miniopterus fraterculus (Chiroptera: Vespertilionidae), with description of a new species. Journal of Mammalogy 88(5):1216–1229.
Goodman, S.M., Maminirina, C.P., Bradman, H.M., Christidis, L. and Appleton, B. 2009. The use of molecular phylogenetic and morphological tools to identify cryptic and paraphyletic species: Examples from the diminutive long-fingered bats (Chiroptera: Miniopteridae: Miniopterus) on Madagascar. American Museum Novitates 3669:1–34.
Musser, G.G. and Carleton, M.D. 2005. Superfamily Muroidea. Pp. 894–1531 in Wilson, D.E. and Reeder, D.M. (eds.). Mammal Species of the World: a taxonomic and geographic reference. 3rd ed. Baltimore: The Johns Hopkins University Press, 2 vols., 2142 pp. 

Natural regions of Africa
Biogeography
Geography of Madagascar
Natural history of Madagascar
Highlands